Hermes was a proposed spaceplane designed by the French Centre National d'Études Spatiales (CNES) in 1975, and later by the European Space Agency (ESA). It was superficially similar to the American Boeing X-20 Dyna-Soar and the larger Space Shuttle.

In January 1985, CNES proposed to proceed with Hermes development under the auspices of the ESA. Hermes was to have been part of a crewed spaceflight program. It would have been launched using an Ariane 5 launch vehicle. In November 1987, the project was approved; it was to commence an initial pre-development phase from 1988 to 1990, after which the authorisation to proceed to full-rate development was to depend on the outcome of this phase. However, the project was subject to numerous delays and funding issues around this period.

In 1992, Hermes was cancelled. This was in part due to unachievable cost and performance goals, as well as the formation of a partnership with the Russian Aviation and Space Agency (RKA), which reduced the demand for an independent crewed spaceplane. As a result, no Hermes shuttles were ever built. During the 2010s, it was proposed to relaunch the Hermes vehicle to serve as a partially reusable air-launched spaceplane launch system, known as SOAR.

Development

Origins
During the 1960s and 1970s, there was increasing recognition within European nations that an increasing level of international cooperation would be necessary in order to embark upon larger space projects. In 1973, the European Space Research Organisation (ESRO) - a precursor to the European Space Agency (ESA) - commenced development of a new civilian heavy expendable launch system, later known as the Ariane rocket. Some members of the ESA, such as the French space agency Centre National D'études Spatiales (CNES), held ambitions of greater capability and autonomy in space affairs to avoid an overreliance upon external partners, such as the activities and decisions of NASA, and envisaged the deployment of a European-built human-capable space vehicle that would operate in conjunction with other ESA assets, such as Ariane.

In 1976, CNES commenced studies into a crewed Ariane concept. Two different concepts for the vehicle were examined in detail, these being a capsule and a glider. In 1983, CNES opted to focus its attention on a space plane as the agency had concluded that such a vehicle would deliver greater convenience, comfort, and cost-effectiveness. Opting for a space plane approach was found to simplify recovery due to it possessing the necessary cross-range manoeuvrability to reach a given point on the Earth within the space of a single day, while also providing for a less challenging re-entry environment for the crew and payload, while being reusable would also serve to reduce the cost of successive missions. Critical technologies identified included thermal protection, environmental controls, life support systems, aerodynamics, and power.

During the mid-1980s, in addition to other ambitions, such as Columbus Man-Tended Free Flyer (an independent European space station) and the Ariane 5 heavy launch vehicle, CNES openly championed and promoted the development and production of the envisaged Spaceshuttle as a European initiative, which would have been akin to the reusable space vehicle programs of other spacefaring powers, such as the Soviet Union's Buran and the United States Space Shuttle.

Selection

On 18 October 1985, CNES appointed French aerospace company Aérospatiale as the primary contractor for Hermes, which was the name that had been given to the spacecraft; additionally, French aircraft manufacturer Dassault-Breguet was awarded responsibility for the aerodynamic and aerothermal aspects of the design. Arianespace was also responsible for the Ariane 5 launcher and had been viewed as being a strong candidate managing the operation of the infrastructure for Hermes.

On 25 October 1985, the proposal for Hermes was presented to the partner nations of the ESA. A deadline of March 1987 was set for the 'Europeanisation' of the programme, under which portions of work for Hermes was assigned to various members; the outlined work share attributed 15 per cent to West Germany, 13 per cent to Italy, 7 per cent to Belgium, 5 per cent to the Netherlands, 4 per cent each to the United Kingdom, Spain, and Sweden, and 2 per cent or less to Switzerland, Austria, Denmark and Ireland; potential participation by Norway and Canada was also mooted. France held a 50 per cent share of the work, although CNES was reported as being open to further redistribution of the work dependent upon individual ESA partners increasing their contributing stake in the programme. Early on, there was optimism that securing the funding to proceed from ESA members would not be difficult.

In November 1987, the ESA issued its approval of the Hermes initiative. As envisaged, by 1995, Hermes would enable the ESA to service the planned Columbus Man-Tended Free Flyer (MTFF) (the MTFF was restructured and ultimately manufactured as the Columbus module of the International Space Station). Development of Hermes was to proceed across a two phase programme.

Phase 1: Study and pre-development.
This phase was originally scheduled to end in 1990. Initially the plans called for a capacity to lift 6 astronauts and 4,550 kg of cargo, but after the Challenger disaster, it was felt necessary to include ejection capacity of some form to give astronauts at least a small chance of survival in case of catastrophe. Accordingly, the six seats were now curtailed to only three regular ejection seats, which were chosen over an entirely ejecting crew capsule that would have given the crew an escape option at heights over 28 km. The cargo capacity was limited to 3,000 kg. Hermes would not be able to place objects into orbit as its cargo hold could not be opened; again this option was abandoned due to weight concerns.

Although Hermes was originally viewed as being entirely reusable (up to 30 successive re-entries without major servicing), problems aligning the capacity of the Ariane 5 launcher with the design of Hermes itself forced it to leave behind its rear part, the Resource Module, before re-entry. A newly built resource module would then be attached to the Hermes space plane and the entire structure would be launched again.

Phase 1 was not completed until the end of 1991 and by then the political climate surrounding Hermes had changed considerably. The Iron Curtain had been lifted and the Cold War was ending. As a result, ESA decided to interject a year-long "reflection" period to examine if it still made sense for Europe to build its own space shuttle and space station or if new partners could be found to share cost and development. Officially, Phase 1 completed at the end of 1992, after a year of reflection.

Phase 2: Final development, manufacture & initial operations.
This phase was never properly started, as ESA and the Russian Aviation and Space Agency (RKA) had agreed to cooperate on future launchers and a replacement space station for Mir. Economic concerns prevented RKA from properly participating in a future launcher program, but at this point most of ESA's crew transport capabilities had been reoriented towards a capsule type system (as opposed to the glider system that Hermes represented) which was what the joint Russian/European designs called for.

When both Russia and ESA joined up with NASA to build the International Space Station, the immediate need for a European crew transport system disappeared as both Russia and the USA had existing capabilities that did not need expansion. Accordingly, ESA decided to abandon the Hermes project.

Design
As intended, Hermes was a reusable launch system that would have been used to transport both astronauts and moderate-size cargo payloads into low Earth orbit (LEO) and back again. In basic concept and operation, Hermes bears a resemblance to other reusable launch vehicles, such as the Space Shuttle. However, unlike the Space Shuttle, Hermes had no ambition to carry heavy cargoes as this role was to be performed by the uncrewed and automated Ariane 5 launcher instead. In the configuration envisioned prior to the project's termination, Hermes was to have been capable of transporting a maximum of three astronauts along with a 3,000 kg pressurized payload. The final launch weight would be 21,000 kg, which was viewed as being the practical upper limit of what an extended Ariane 5 launcher would be capable of lifting.

Hermes was envisaged to be launched using the Ariane 5, replacing the upper stage of the latter during such missions, and would have detached from the launcher towards the latter part of the ascent. Prior to the 1986 redesign, Hermes was a single spaceplane containing (from front to back) a crew compartment for six, an airlock, an unpressurized cargo hold similar to Buran's and the Shuttle's, and a service module. After 1986, due to the Challenger accident, it was substantially redesigned.  The crew cabin was shrunk to only carry three astronauts, with the cargo hold now pressurized and unable to carry or bring back satellites. Hermes now consisted of two separate sections: the vehicle itself and a cone-shaped Resource Module, which was to contain a docking mechanism and have been attached to the vehicle's rear, and would have been detached and discarded prior to re-entry. Only the crewed vehicle would re-enter Earth's atmosphere and be re-used; both the Resource Module and the launcher would be expended. When operated in conjunction with Hermes, the Ariane 5 would have had its upper stage entirely replaced to accommodate both the space plane and an adaptor to mate the vehicle with the main cryogenic stage. The equipment bay of the launcher would also be absent while the spaceplane itself would perform all guidance and control functions. The development and configuration of the Ariane 5 was strongly influenced by the requirements of Hermes, such as the extra aerodynamic loads that it would have imposed along with the elevated reliability factor of 0.9999, while retaining minimal impact on the launcher's commercial competitiveness on non-Hermes missions.

In comparison to the Space Shuttle, Hermes was a substantially smaller vehicle. As well as being scaled down, it does not share the ogival planform of the Shuttle, the designers having opted for a highly-swept delta wing complete with wingtip devices, similar to the proposed Boeing X-20 Dyna-Soar spacecraft. Like the Shuttle, the pressurised cabin would seat more than five people, two of which could serve as the pilots; while the unpressurised cargo bay positioned aft of them would have been fitted with large doors spanning the length of the bay along the fuselage. The vehicle would have been powered by a pair of 2,000N-thrust liquid propellant rocket motors, which were to have been identical to those used on the L4 low-energy upper stage of the Ariane 5.

Aerodynamic control would have been provided via a total of seven flight control surfaces, the wingtip rudders, trailing edge elevon/air brakes, and a body-mounted flap; these surfaces would have been controlled via quadruplex-redundant digital flight controls and actuated via triplex-redundant hydraulics. Mission management would have been performed via three general-purpose computers, a monitoring computer, and three digital databuses. Electrical power was to be provided by a motor that would have used liquid oxygen-liquid hydrogen along with ten US-built fuel cells. The environmental control and life support systems supply pressurisation of the cabin, along with air, water, and warmth, to support the crew for a maximum of 40 days, although may have been potentially extendable to enable 90 day missions. For autonomous operations, Hermes was to have been able to operate for up to one month, and would be able to remain docked with an orbiting space station for a maximum of 90 days.

According to CNES, Hermes would have been subject to more extreme re-entry conditions than the Space Shuttle due to its smaller size resulting in the vehicle being subject to higher aerothermal pressures. The baseline thermal protection, which was to be capable of withstanding temperatures of 1,400-1,600 °C for a minimum of 20 minutes and studied by Dassault and SEP, would have consisted of carbon elements with an anti-oxidant coating applied to portions of the nose and leading edges of the wings, while thermal tiles were to have covered the underside of the wing and fuselage. These tiles, which were to be fastened into place, would have employed thin, reinforced ceramic-carbon honeycomb composite insulating layers separated by thin sheets of metal alloy to reflect the heat; an alternative concept for the tiles would have employed higher metallic portions in place of ceramics. The upper surfaces of the vehicle, which would have been subject to less heat than the lower surfaces, would have used flexible blanket-like low-density, glassfibre-ceramic layers.

The shape of Hermes had been effectively frozen by November 1985. This shape had been largely devised by subsonic wind tunnel testing in the Onera, as the spaceplane was largely constrained by the requirements of subsonic flight. In order to gather valuable data in the face of Europe's lack of experience at operating such vehicles, Dassault proposed validating the aerodynamic properties of the vehicle by completing an 1 • 4-tonne, 1-scale aerothermal demonstrator, named Maia, which was envisaged as being launched by an Ariane 4 for re-entry studies.

Mission profiles and infrastructure
A total of four typical missions were projected for Hermes:
 Hosting onboard experiments while in an equatorial 800 km orbit
 Flights to NASA's space station Freedom at a 28.5 degree orbit 
 Flights to ESA's space station Columbus at a 60 degree orbit.
 Flights to ESA's uncrewed remote sensing Polar Platform at a 98 degree 500 km orbit

After each mission, Hermes would be refurbished at a dedicated facility based in Europe. Around 40 days prior to a launch date, the vehicle would be air-transported via a specially-modified Airbus A300 airliner to its launch site in Kourou, French Guiana, where upon it would be integrated with its payload and installed atop an Ariane 5 rocket prior to being transferred to the launch pad. Mission control was to be based at Toulouse, France. Throughout a typical mission, communications and tracking would have been performed using various means, including a then-planned European network of data relay satellites, which would have enabled coverage across 75 per cent of a Hermes mission at a 28.5 degree orbit at a distance of 400 km.

Following a mission, it was intended for Hermes to normally land at Istres-Le Tubé Air Base on Istres. Various other potential landing sites were mooted, including Guiana Space Centre, Martinique Aimé Césaire International Airport on the island of Fort de France and unspecified airstrips in Bermuda. In the event of an aborted launch within the first 84 second of ignition, Hermes would be able to return to Kourou. A later-timed abort was to have likely necessitated a water landing in the Atlantic Ocean, after which the vehicle would need to be retrieved via a recovery ship. Other emergency landing strips were to have been designated dependent upon the specifics of each mission.

Mockups and models
A full scale mockup was built in 1986, and was shown in 1987 at Le Bourget in May, followed by Madrid in September and Toulouse during October - November. The following year (1988) the mockup was shown at Strasbourg in Abril, Hanover in May, and Bordeaux in December.
With the end of the project in 1993, this mockup was transferred to ENSICA (École nationale supérieures d'ingénieurs de construction aéronautique).
In 1995 it was brought to Le Bourget for a possible restoration.

A 1/7 scale model built by EADS is shown since 2002 at the Bordeaux–Mérignac Airport.

In media
 A 1994 The Simpsons episode called Deep Space Homer features a Hermes inspired shuttle design.
 The 2017 film Valerian and the City of a Thousand Planets's novelization mentions Hermes as the shuttle used by ESA during its first expedition to the International Space Station (identified as "Alpha").

See also

References

Citations

Bibliography

 Van den Abeelen, Luc. "Spaceplane HERMES - Europe's Dream of Independent Manned Spaceflight.".
 Moxon, Julian, Graham Warwick and Gilbert Sedbon. "Hermes: France forces the pace." Flight International, 30 November 1985. pp. 24–27.

External links
 Hermes at Astronautix.com
 Hermes at Aerospaceguide.net
 1:1 Mockup photos, including cockpit
 HERMES, l' avion spatial inachevé...

Proposed European Space Agency spacecraft
Crewed spacecraft
Cancelled spacecraft
Spaceplanes